Dobromyśl may refer to the following places in Poland:
Dobromyśl, Lower Silesian Voivodeship (south-west Poland)
Dobromyśl, Biała Podlaska County in Lublin Voivodeship (east Poland)
Dobromyśl, Chełm County in Lublin Voivodeship (east Poland)
Dobromyśl, Greater Poland Voivodeship (west-central Poland)
Dobromyśl, West Pomeranian Voivodeship (north-west Poland)